Hyas is a genus of oregoniid crabs.

Species
Hyas comprises five extant species:
Hyas alutaceus Brandt, 1851
Hyas araneus (Linnaeus, 1758)
Hyas coarctatus Leach, 1815
Hyas lyratus Dana, 1851
Hyas ursinus Rathbun, 1924

References

External links

Majoidea
Decapod genera
Taxa named by William Elford Leach